Peggy Davis-Mullen (born 1960) is a  former member of the Boston City Council in Boston, Massachusetts, having served from 1994 to 2001.

She ran for Mayor of Boston in the 2001 mayoral election against incumbent Thomas Menino; she lost, but is recognized as the "second female finalist for mayor in city history."

References

Further reading
 E. Mehren. Boston's Mayor, a Bland Favorite; Election: In a city of fiery politics, the race between incumbent Thomas Menino and Peggy Davis-Mullen plods along sedately. Los Angeles Times. November 3, 2001
 S. Ryan-Vollmar. Q&A: Peggy Davis-Mullen. Boston Phoenix, November 15–22, 2001
 H. Carr, The Brothers Bulger, Grand Central Publishing, 2007

Boston City Council members
Boston School Committee members
1960 births
People from South Boston
Living people
Women city councillors in Massachusetts
21st-century American women